Gymnopilus fulvosquamulosus is a species of mushroom-forming fungus in the family Hymenogastraceae.

See also

List of Gymnopilus species

fulvosquamulosus
Fungi described in 1969
Taxa named by Lexemuel Ray Hesler